Pissgrave is an American death metal band formed in 2013 in Philadelphia, Pennsylvania. The current line-up of the band consists of Tim Mellon (guitar, vocals), Demian Fenton (guitar, vocals), Matt Mellon (drums) and Brad Dumville (bass). The band is known for its "extreme old-school death metal" sound and graphic album covers.

History
Pissgrave was formed in 2013 by guitarists Tim Mellon and Demian Fenton, drummer Matt Mellon and bassist John Guarracino. The band released its self-titled demo tape in 2014 on Graceless Recordings, which attracted attention for its "primitive production" and extreme sound. Following its release, the band signed to Profound Lore Records, which issued their full-length debut album Suicide Euphoria in 2015. The record was produced by Arthur Rizk.

Following the band's North American tour, founding bassist John Guarracino departed the band to focus on his other project, Hæthen. He was replaced by Brad Dumville. The band collaborated again with Arthur Rizk on its second studio album, 2019's Posthumous Humiliation. The record was described as "one of the best death metal albums of 2019" by Pitchfork and Exclaim!. Pitchfork additionally listed Posthumous Humiliation on its list of "The Best Metal Albums of 2019."

Musical style
Pissgrave's sound has been characterized primarily as death metal, with AllMusic's Thom Jurek describing the band as "one of the more outrageous acts to emerge from the barebones ethos of old-school death metal with a war metal production aesthetic." The band's sound has been compared to that of Deicide, Revenge and Cannibal Corpse. The band's cover arts feature graphic violence.

On the band's sound and aesthetic, guitarist Tim Mellon has stated: "The overall aesthetic is reality-based death. Pissgrave are rooted in reality rather than fantasy. Images of violent, offensive death [are] what is necessary to portray us musically and visually."

Members
Current members
Matt Mellon – drums (2013–present)
Tim Mellon – guitar, vocals (2013–present)
Demian Fenton – guitar, vocals (2013–present)
Brad Dumville – bass (2017–present) 

Former members
John Guarracino – bass (2013–2017)

Discography
Studio albums
 Suicide Euphoria (2015)
 Posthumous Humiliation (2019)

Demos
 Pissgrave (2014)

References

External links

 

Musical groups established in 2013
Musical quartets
American death metal musical groups
Heavy metal musical groups from Pennsylvania
Profound Lore Records artists
2013 establishments in Pennsylvania